The Munsif Daily is an Urdu language newspaper published from Hyderabad in India. Its Editor-in-chief is Mohammad Abdul Jaleel. The Munsif Daily is the largest circulated Urdu newspaper in India.

History 
The paper was owned by Mahmood Ansari, and after his death in 1994 it was looked after by his elder brother, Masood Ansari. As Masood Ansari fell ill, the newspaper was sold to Khan Lateef Khan in 1996, who became editor in chief.

Under the editorship of Khan Lateef Khan, many changes were made in the Munsif Daily such as the introduction of a fully coloured version.

References

External links
 
 Urdu edition
 e-paper edition

See also
 The Siasat Daily

Newspapers published in Hyderabad
Urdu-language newspapers published in India
Daily newspapers published in India
Newspapers established in 1996
1996 establishments in Andhra Pradesh